Pien may refer to:

Geography
 Piên, a town in Brazil
 Two towns in Poland:
 Pień, Kuyavian-Pomeranian Voivodeship
 Pień, Podkarpackie Voivodeship
 Pien, Burkina Faso
 Pianu , a commune located in Alba County, Romania

People
Pien, affectionate nickname for Jacqueline (given name), Josephine or Francine in the Netherlands
Armand Pien (1920-2003), Belgian weatherman
Ed Pien (1958), Canadian artist born in Taiwan
Lark Pien (1972),  American cartoonist
Bian Que (redirect from Pien Ch'iao) (died 310 BC) Chinese physician
Bian Zhilin (redirect from Pien Chih-lin) (Chinese: 卞之琳 1910–2000)
José Lacasa Piens, founder of Lacasa, the oldest chocolate factory in Spain

Other 
Piens ("milk"), Latvian album by The Satellites 1998
Pien tze huang (片仔癀; Piànzǎihuáng) Chinese herbal formula first time documented during the Ming Dynasty (1555)
Pien Fu (Chinese: 弁服; pinyin: biànfú) knee-length tunic over a skirt or pair of pants
Bianhua, the concept of gradual transformation in Confucian or Taoist philosophy